MacGahan and McGahan are Northern Irish surnames. They are Anglicised forms of the Irish language Mac Eacháin, meaning "son of Eachán". The personal name Eachán is a diminutive of the personal name Eachaidh, which is based upon the Gaelic each, meaning "horse".

People surnamed McGahan or MacGahan

Andrew McGahan (1966–2019), Australian novelist
Anna McGahan (born 1988), Australian actress and playwright
Bronwyn McGahan (born 1972), Irish Sinn Féin politician
Hugh McGahan (born 1961), New Zealand rugby league footballer
Jamie McGahan (born 1959), Scottish cyclist
Matt McGahan (born 1993), New Zealand rugby union footballer
Januarius MacGahan (1844–1878), American journalist and war correspondent
Paul McGahan (born 1964), New Zealand rugby union footballer
Thomas McGahan (1845–1932), Australian politician
Tony McGahan, (born 1972), Australian rugby union coach
Walter G. McGahan (1902–1981), New York politician

References

Anglicised Irish-language surnames
Patronymic surnames